The following is a list of churches in North Devon.

Active churches 
The only civil parishes without churches are Pilton West and Queen's Nympton. The district has an estimated 130 churches for 94,600 people, a ratio of one church to every 728 inhabitants.

Defunct churches

References 

North Devon
 
Churches